The 18 municipalities of the North Savo Region in Finland are divided on five sub-regions.



Inner Savonia sub-region 
Rautalampi
Suonenjoki
Tervo
Vesanto

Kuopio sub-region 
Kuopio
Siilinjärvi

North Eastern Savonia sub-region 
Kaavi
Rautavaara
Tuusniemi

Upper Savonia sub-region 
Iisalmi (Idensalmi)
Keitele
Kiuruvesi
Lapinlahti
Pielavesi
Sonkajärvi
Vieremä

Varkaus sub-region 
Joroinen (Jorois)
Leppävirta
Varkaus

See also 
Eastern Finland
Regions of Eastern Finland

External links